Robert Spitzer may refer to:

 Robert Spitzer (political scientist) (born 1953), American political scientist
 Robert Spitzer (priest) (born 1952), American Jesuit priest and philosopher
 Robert Spitzer (psychiatrist) (1932–2015), American psychiatrist
 Robert R. Spitzer (1922–2019), American industrialist and educator